Eupithecia olgae is a moth in the family Geometridae. It is found in Uzbekistan, Kyrgyzstan, Tajikistan, Afghanistan, Pakistan, India (Jammu & Kashmir), south-eastern Kazakhstan, China (Tibet, Qinghai, Gansu, Shanxi) and Mongolia.

References

Moths described in 1986
olgae
Moths of Asia